City of Sorcerers is a 1983 board game published by Standard Games and Publications.

Gameplay
City of Sorcerers is a fantasy boardgame for two to four players in which apprentice wizards struggle to gain the powers that will help them to claim sorcerer status, which must be confirmed in the Sorcerers' Arena.

Reception
Allen Varney reviewed City of Sorcerers in Space Gamer No. 71. Varney commented that "City of Sorcerers can be fascinating at times, and is often at least enjoyable. What we have here is a highly uneven design with considerable replay value: If one game doesn't turn out well, try again and it's bound to be different. It has lots of flavor and tries things I've never seen in other games. A qualified recommendation."

Robert Hulston reviewed City of Sorcerers for Imagine magazine, and stated that "Unfortunately, though fast -moving. Quite fun, and easily finishable in under three hours. City of Sorcerors suffers from poorly written rules. They are too brief and consequently flawed."

References

Board games introduced in 1983